Iñigo Manrique de Lara (died 1496) was a Roman Catholic prelate who served as Bishop of Córdoba (1485–1496) and Bishop of León (1484–1485).

Biography
In 1484, Iñigo Manrique de Lara was appointed during the papacy of Pope Sixtus IV as Bishop of León. In 1485, he was appointed during the papacy of Pope Innocent VIII as Bishop of Córdoba. He served as Bishop of Córdoba until his death in 1496.

References

External links and additional sources
 (for Chronology of Bishops) 
 (for Chronology of Bishops) 
 (for Chronology of Bishops) 
 (for Chronology of Bishops) 

15th-century Roman Catholic bishops in Castile
Bishops appointed by Pope Sixtus IV
Bishops appointed by Pope Innocent VIII
1496 deaths